Otto Sirgo (born Otto Sirgo Haller; December 19, 1946 in Havana, Cuba) is a Cuban actor and director of Mexican telenovelas and theater. He is the son of Cuban actor Otto Sirgo and Mexican actress Magda Haller and was married to Maleni Morales, also an actress, until her death in 2020. He starred in Recien Cazado along with Jaime Camil and Gabriela Vargas.

Awards

Association of Theater Journalists
Best monologue for El otro Rostro de Dios

TV shows
 No empujen
 Dos mujeres en mi casa as a director

Telenovelas
 Vencer el pasado (2021) Telenovela ... Eusébio
  Falsa identidad (2020) Telenovela ... Plácido Arismendi (El Apá)
 Preso No. 1  (2019) Telenovela ... Benito Rivas
 Ringo (2019) Telenovela ...  Iván Garay Beltrán
 Enemigo íntimo (2018) Telenovela ... Nemesio Rendón
 Tres veces Ana (2016) Telenovela ... Rodrigo Casasola
  Lo que la vida me robó (2014) Telenovela ... Regino
 Quiero Amarte (2013) Telenovela ... Manuel Olazabal
 Cachito de cielo (2012) Telenovela ... Gustavo Mendiola
 Por ella soy Eva (2012) Telenovela ... Jesus Legarreta
 Ni Contigo Ni Sin Ti (2011) Telenovela ... Octavio
 Sortilegio (2009) Telenovela .... Jorge Krueger
 Un Gancho al Corazon  (2008/2009) Telenovela ... Salvador Ulloa
 Palabra de Mujer (2007/08) Telenovela .... Mariano Álvarez y Junco
 Amar sin límites (2006/07) Telenovela .... Alfredo Toscano
 La Esposa Virgen (2005) Telenovela .... Dr. Mendoza
 Mujer de Madera (2004/05) Telenovela .... Leopoldo
 Niña amada mía (2003) Telenovela .... Arquitecto Octavio Uriarte
 El Juego de la vida (2001/02) Telenovela .... Javier
 Por un beso (2000/01) Telenovela .... Julio Otero
 DKDA: Sueños de juventud (1999/2000) Telenovela .... Eduardo Arias
 Alma rebelde (1999) Telenovela .... Don Marcelo Rivera Hill
 Uno Luz en el camino (1998) Telenovela .... Padre Federico
 El Secreto de Alejandra (1997) Telenovela .... Carlos
 Lazos de amor (1995/96) Telenovela .... Eduardo .... TVyNovelas Award for Supporting Actor (1996)
 Buscando el paraíso (1993) Telenovela .... Don Angel
 Tenías que ser tú (1993) Telenovela
 Alcanzar una estrella II (1991) Telenovela .... Alejandro Loredo
 Morir para vivir (1989) Telenovela
 Rosa Salvaje (1987/88) Telenovela .... Angel de la Huerta
 Cautiva (1986) Telenovela .... Daniel
 Vivir enamorada (1982) Telenovela .... Andres
 Un Solo corazón (1983) Telenovela .... Oscar Padilla
 Juegos del destino (1981) Telenovela .... Luis
 Juventud (1980) Telenovela .... Rafael
 Mamá Campanita (1978) Telenovela .... Enrique
 La Venganza (1977) Telenovela .... Alfonso
 Rina (1977) Telenovela .... Omar
 Barata de primavera (1975) Telenovela .... Antonio
 Marina (1974) Telenovela
 El Honorable Sr.Valdes (1973) Telenovela
 Entre brumas (1973) Telenovela .... Enrico
 Los Miserables (1973) Telenovela .... Felix Tholomyes
 Las Gemelas (1972) Telenovela
 Me llaman Martina Sola (1972) Telenovela
 El Amor tiene cara de mujer (1971) Telenovela .... Cristian
 Honor y orgullo (1969) Telenovela
 La Cruz de Marisa Cruces (1970) Telenovela .... Hector

Plays
 Confesiones de una güera oxigenada (2005)
 El otro rostro de Dios (2003)
 Desencuentros (2002)
 Yo odio a Hamlet as John Barrymore
 La Dama de Negro
 P.D. Tu Gato ha Muerto ("P.S. Your Cat Is Dead", 1997–2000) as Jimmy
 Violinista en el Tejado ("Fiddler on the Roof")
 Alta Seducción
 Intruso de Media Noche
 Mi Quinto Amor
 El prisionero de la Segunda Avenida
 ¡Atrápame si Puedes!
 Los Japoneses no Esperan

External links
Otto Sirgo at the Telenovela database

 

1946 births
Living people
20th-century Cuban male actors
21st-century Cuban male actors
Cuban emigrants to Mexico
Cuban male stage actors
Cuban male television actors
Cuban male telenovela actors
Male actors from Havana